Moldova sent a delegation to compete at the 2008 Summer Paralympics in Beijing. According to official records, the country's only athletic representative was female powerlifter Larisa Marinenkova.

Powerlifting

Women

See also
2008 Summer Paralympics
Moldova at the Paralympics
Moldova at the 2008 Summer Olympics

References

External links
International Paralympic Committee

Nations at the 2008 Summer Paralympics
2008
Paralympics